John Kay (born Joachim Fritz Krauledat; 12 April 1944) is a German-born American rock singer, songwriter, and guitarist known as the frontman of Steppenwolf.

Early life
He was born in Tilsit, East Prussia, Germany (now Sovetsk, Kaliningrad Oblast, Russia).
His father Fritz, born 13 June 1913 in Absteinen near Pogegen in the Memelland (today Opstainys in Pagėgiai Municipality, Lithuania), was killed a month before Kay was born.

In early 1945, his mother fled with him from the advancing Soviet troops during the evacuation of East Prussia in harsh winter conditions. Their train got stuck near Arnstadt, which was first occupied by the Americans, but then became part of the East German Soviet occupation zone. In 1949, they crossed the already-fortified border to resettle in Hanover, West Germany (as recounted in his song "Renegade" on the album Steppenwolf 7). Now living in the British occupation zone, the young Joachim, who had eye problems and could not speak or understand English, was first inspired by and learned about rock ‘n’ roll music while listening to Little Richard on U.S. Armed Forces radio. When his family moved to Toronto in 1958, teachers had a hard time pronouncing his birth name, so he was called John K instead. Five years later, they moved to Buffalo, New York.

Musical career

In 1965, invited by fellow German-born bass player Nick St. Nicholas (born Klaus Kassbaum), Kay joined a blues rock and folk music group known as The Sparrows, which had moderate success in Canada before moving to California, augmenting its line-up, and changing its name to Steppenwolf in 1967. With music that pioneered hard rock and heavy metal, Kay's Steppenwolf had international success with songs such as "Born to Be Wild", "Magic Carpet Ride", "Monster", "The Pusher", and "Rock Me".

Kay recorded both as a solo artist and with Steppenwolf during the late 1970s, and wrapped up Steppenwolf's 40th year of touring with what was to be a final gig in October 2018. Kay and Steppenwolf appeared on 24 July 2010 at the three-day HullabaLOU music festival in Louisville, Kentucky.

Awards and recognition

In 2004, although he never became a Canadian citizen, Kay was inducted into Canada's Walk of Fame in recognition of the beginning of his musical career in Toronto. Kay was present at the induction ceremony in Toronto and reiterated his strong affection for Canada. He was also nominated as part of Steppenwolf for induction into the Rock and Roll Hall of Fame in 2016 for the induction year 2017. In 2018, Steppenwolf's "Born to Be Wild" was one of the first five record singles to be inducted into The Rock n Roll Hall of Fame.

Personal life
Kay is married to Jutta Maue, whom he met in 1965 in Canada while she was working in a coffeehouse where Kay's band, The Sparrows, were playing.  They have one daughter, Shawn.  The couple founded the Maue-Kay Foundation, which supports human rights and the protection of wildlife and the environment.

In 2016, Kay credited his relationship with Jutta as part of the inspiration for Steppenwolf's "Magic Carpet Ride".

As of 2005, Kay has residences in West Vancouver, British Columbia, and Nashville, Tennessee.

Discography

Steppenwolf

Solo

Solo singles

References

External links
Steppenwolf's official website
Kay's Biography
John Kay & Company - The Lost Heritage Tapes (CD 1997; recorded 1976, but previously unreleased)
  Matthias Greffrath, ZEITmagazin LEBEN, Nr. 8, 14.02.2008 (report from a childhood friend)
John Kay Interview - NAMM Oral History Library (2016)
 
 
  as Joachim Krauledat

1944 births
Living people
People from Tilsit
People from East Prussia
German rock guitarists
German male guitarists
West German emigrants to Canada
Rhythm guitarists
Canadian rock guitarists
Canadian male guitarists
Canadian rock singers
Canadian singer-songwriters
Canadian Music Hall of Fame inductees
Canadian emigrants to the United States
Dunhill Records artists
Epic Records artists
MCA Records artists
Mercury Records artists
Atlantic Records artists
Blind musicians
I.R.S. Records artists
Steppenwolf (band) members